Korinna Ishimtseva (born ) is a Kazakhstani female volleyball player. She is a member of the Kazakhstan women's national volleyball team and played for Zhetysu Almaty in 2014. 

She was part of the Kazakhstani national team at the 2014 FIVB Volleyball Women's World Championship in Italy.

Clubs
  Zhetysu Almaty (2014)

References

External links
http://worldgrandprix.2015.fivb.com/en/finals-3/competition/teams/kaz-kazakhstan/players/korinna-ishimtseva?id=44479
https://web.archive.org/web/20170507072827/http://www.scoresway.com/?sport=volleyball
http://www.zimbio.com/Brankica+Mihajlovic+Korinna+Ishimtseva/pictures/pro
http://www.gettyimages.com/photos/korinna-ishimtseva?excludenudity=true&sort=mostpopular&mediatype=photography&phrase=korinna%20ishimtseva

1984 births
Living people
Kazakhstani women's volleyball players
People from Pavlodar
Volleyball players at the 2008 Summer Olympics
Olympic volleyball players of Kazakhstan
Asian Games medalists in volleyball
Volleyball players at the 2002 Asian Games
Volleyball players at the 2006 Asian Games
Volleyball players at the 2010 Asian Games
Medalists at the 2010 Asian Games
Asian Games bronze medalists for Kazakhstan